Zero Tolerance Magazine is an extreme music magazine published by Obdurate Ltd. in the United Kingdom. Published bi-monthly,  it can be found on newsstands in the UK, Europe and North America - and is available (with some delay) on newsstands in Australia and specialist retailers in New Zealand and Taiwan. The magazine features a covermount CD.

It was launched in 2004 by Lisa Macey (formerly publisher of Terrorizer Magazine) and Leon Macey (of experimental UK extreme metal band Mithras). The magazine is edited by Lisa Macey. Previous editors are Nathan T. Birk, Calum Harvie and Lee du-Caine.

Alongside interviews with bands, reviews, news and a metal crossword, industry features with visual artists, directors, music producers and the like have been regular in Zero Tolerance Magazine since its launch in 2004 and the magazine has been home to interviews with the likes of HR Giger, Dan Seagrave, John Carpenter and Andy Sneap.

Contributors, referred to as "The Panel", hail from the UK, North America, continental Europe, and Australia. Notable regular contributors include Chris Kee, Alan Averill (also known as Nemtheanga of Primordial), John Norby, Olivier 'Zoltar' Badin, Jose Carlos Santos, Will Pinfold, Geoff Birchenall, Graham Matthews, John Mincemoyer, Paul Carter - who is also involved in the commercial side of the magazine - and more.

References

External links
 Zero Tolerance Magazine

2004 establishments in the United Kingdom
Bi-monthly magazines published in the United Kingdom
British heavy metal music
Music magazines published in the United Kingdom
Heavy metal publications
Magazines established in 2004